Ranjangaon Sandus  (Mr:रांजणगाव सांडस) is a panchayat village in the state of Maharashtra, India, on the left (east) bank of the Bhima River just above its intersection with the Mula-Mutha River.  Administratively, Ranjangaon Sandas is under Shirur Taluka of Pune District in Maharashtra.  The village of Ranjangaon Sandas is 5.5 km by road south of the village of Alegaon Paga, and 38 km by road south of the town of Shirur.

There are two villages in the Ranjangaon Sandas gram panchayat: Ranjangaon Sandas and Rakshewadi (Rakshevadi). Rakshewadi is located just over 2 km north of Ranjangaon Sandas.

Demographics 
In the 2001 census, the village of Ranjangaon Sandus had 3,593 inhabitants, with 1,856 males (51.6%) and 1,737 females (48.4%), for a gender ratio of 936 females per thousand males.

Education
Zilha parishad school up 7th standard. Ranjangaon Sandas has a secondary school: Shri. Santraj Maharaj Vidyalaya. this vidyalaya was established by  Shantaram Vaman Randive and Advocate Prakash Shitole.

Notes

External links 
 
 

Villages in Pune district